Folate receptors bind folate and reduced folic acid derivatives and mediates delivery of tetrahydrofolate to the interior of cells. It is then converted from monoglutamate to polyglutamate forms - such as 5-methyltetrahydrofolate - as only monoglutamate forms can be transported across cell membranes. Polyglutamate forms are biologically active enzymatic cofactors required for many folate-dependent processes such as folate-dependent one-carbon metabolism. These proteins are attached to the membrane by a GPI anchor. A riboflavin-binding protein required for the transport of riboflavin to the developing oocyte in chicken also belong to this family.

Human proteins from this family include:
 FOLR1: folate receptor 1 (adult),
 FOLR2: folate receptor 2 (fetal), and 
 FOLR3: folate receptor gamma.

References 

Protein families
Membrane proteins